James Cowie (9 January 1809 – 14 November 1892) was an early 19th-century settler of Victoria, Australia, who became a member of both the Victorian Legislative Assembly and Victorian Legislative Council and also served as Mayor of Geelong.

Life and work
Cowie was born in Falkirk, Scotland, the son of a brewer. After an apprenticeship as a saddler and harness maker in London, Cowie emigrated to Australia in 1840; and, after a spell in Van Diemen's Land, he settled in Geelong, which was then known as Corio. He established a number of successful commercial ventures, including shops and a mining & shipping agency, and he made his fortune during the Victorian gold rush. When the Geelong municipality was formed in 1849, he was among those who provided financial securities for the new body to carry out works and topped the poll in the first elections for the council. In November 1852, Cowie was elected mayor of Geelong. He served as mayor for a year before being elected to represent Geelong in the Legislative Council of Victoria  following the separation of Victoria from New South Wales in 1851. After two years, he resigned to undertake a short visit to Britain. He returned to Australia aboard the Schomberg, which was wrecked on its maiden voyage off Port Campbell. Cowie was rescued and returned to Geelong. From October 1956 Cowie served on the new Legislative Council representing South Western Province until September 1858 before being elected to the Legislative Assembly for Geelong East.

Cowie is included in the photographic montage published by Thomas Foster Chuck in 1872 entitled "The Explorers and Early Colonists of Victoria". The Cowie ward on the present day Geelong Council is named to commemorate him.

References

 

1809 births
1892 deaths
19th-century Australian politicians
History of Victoria (Australia)
Mayors of Geelong
Members of the Victorian Legislative Assembly
Members of the Victorian Legislative Council
People from Falkirk
Scottish emigrants to colonial Australia
Settlers of Victoria (Australia)